Sha'al is an Israeli settlement and moshav in the northern Golan Heights.

The international community considers Israeli settlements in the Golan Heights illegal under international law, but the Israeli government disputes this.

History
The gar'in that established Sha'al was formed in 1976 in protest at a UN resolution condemning Israel. They were initially based in an army base in Quneitra before moving to the site of Sha'al in 1980 at a time when the Golan Heights was a part of the Israeli Military Governorate. The name of the moshav is a Hebrew acronym of: ("שב עם לאדמתו") "Shav Am LeAdmato." ("Returned the people to its land."). In 1981, the area of Golan was unilaterally annexed by Israel, abolishing military occupation system and imposing Israeli civil rule on the area.

See also
Israeli-occupied territories

References

Israeli settlements in the Golan Heights
Golan Regional Council
Moshavim
Populated places in Northern District (Israel)
Populated places established in 1980
1980 establishments in the Israeli Military Governorate